Turn Left at the End of the World (Sof HaOlam Smola) is a 2004 Israeli film written, produced and directed by Avi Nesher and starring Netta Garti and Liraz Charhi.

Plot
The film takes place in a small Negev development town in 1968 and narrates the struggle of Moroccan and Indian olim, focusing on the relationship between two girls, Sarah Talkar and Nicole Shushan.

Cast
Netta Garti: Nicole Shushan
Liraz Charhi: Sarah Talkar
Aure Atika: Simone Toledano
Ruby Porat Shoval: Jeannette Shushan
Krutika Desai Khan: Rachel Talkar
Jean Benguigui: Isaac Shushan
Parmeet Sethi: Roger Talkar
British Cricket Player: Eyal Ben-Ze'ev

Production
Outdoor scenes were filmed in Midreshet Ben-Gurion.

Reception
The film participated in international film festivals in the United States, Australia, India and European countries, and received several awards, including the Audience Award at the festival Taormina Film Fest and the Jury Prize at the Tokyo International Film Festival. 
Following its release in Israel, the film sold over 600,000 tickets, breaking box office records.

References

External links
"Turn Left at the End of the World" - The full film is available on VOD on the website for the Israel Film Archive - Jerusalem Cinematheque

Turn Left at the End of the World at the Israeli Film Database
 

2004 films
2000s Hebrew-language films
2000s French-language films

2000s coming-of-age drama films
Films directed by Avi Nesher
Films about Moroccan Jews
Films set in 1968
Films set in Israel
Israeli coming-of-age drama films
2004 drama films
2000s English-language films
2004 multilingual films
Israeli multilingual films